A special election was held in the U.S. state of Minnesota on February 14, 2017, to elect a new representative for District 32B in the Minnesota House of Representatives, caused by a ruling by the Minnesota Supreme Court that incumbent Bob Barrett was ineligible to be a candidate in the general election on November 8, 2016. Anne Neu, the Republican nominee, won the special election.

Background
On August 26, 2016, Minnesota Second District Court judge George Stephenson found that Republican incumbent Bob Barrett did not reside in District 32B. Candidates for the Minnesota Legislature must reside in the district in which they are running for the preceding six months of the election. The case was referred to the Minnesota Supreme Court and on September 8, 2016, it ruled Barrett ineligible to be a candidate in District 32B. A vacancy in nomination less than 80 days of a general election results in an automatic special election.

Candidates
All the candidates of the general election—except for Barrett—were automatically candidates of the special election. In this case, Laurie Warner was the Minnesota Democratic–Farmer–Labor Party (DFL) nominee. The Republicans selected Anne Neu to be their nominee.

Results

See also
 List of special elections to the Minnesota House of Representatives

References

External links
 Information on the special election at the Minnesota Secretary of State website

2017 Minnesota elections
Minnesota special elections